The Principality of Elba was a non-hereditary monarchy established by the Treaty of Fontainebleau on 11 April 1814. It lasted less than a year, and its only head was Napoleon Bonaparte, who would return to rule in France before his ultimate defeat and the dissolution of the Principality.

Formation
Sovereignty over the island, which until then had been part of the French département of Méditerranée, was given to Napoleon I of France after his abdication following the War of the Sixth Coalition. Article 3 of the treaty stipulated that Elba was to be "an independent principality possessed by him in complete sovereignty and as personal property". His rule was to persist until his death, at which point control of the Principality would pass to Tuscany. The former Emperor of the French was also granted a stipend of two million francs per year to be paid by France.

Military

As allowed by the Treaty of Fontainebleau, Napoleon brought 870 men to the island with him from France. The army was made up of 566 from the elite Garde Impériale (both infantry and cavalry) and the remaining 300 were from a small battalion of grenadiers. The army was under the supervision of General Drouot and commanded by General Cambronne and the staff headquarters. The navy consisted of 66 men and one ship: the double-masted, 18-gunned brig, . A small flotilla of two other sloops also accompanied Inconstant. The fleet was first commanded by Lieutenant Taillade; however, after nearly losing Inconstant in a storm, Taillade was replaced by lieutenant J. Chautard, who would later ferry Napoleon back from Elba in 1815. Paoli Filidoro was appointed Captain of the Gendarmerie and operated under Giuseppe Balbiani as Intendant General. The combined armed forces by 1815 on Elba numbered about 1,000 men, costing over half of the island's treasury to pay, equip, and feed.

Residence
The Villa Napoleonica (or Villa San Martino) is one of the two residences occupied in Portoferraio by Napoleon Bonaparte during his exile on the Island of Elba, where it was his summer residence. The second, the Palazzina dei Mulini, is located in the historic center of the town of Portoferraio, 3.5 km northeast of San Martino.

In 1839, Anatole Demidoff, a Russian industrialist and patron, a great admirer of Napoleon I and husband of a niece of the emperor, Princess Mathilde Bonaparte, had the Florentine architect Niccolò Matas build the Demidoff Gallery at the foot of the original building.

Dissolution

On 26 February 1815, after ruling Elba for nearly 10 months, Napoleon escaped from the island and landed in southern France to retake power, beginning the War of the Seventh Coalition. After his defeat at the Battle of Waterloo, Napoleon was transported by Britain to the island of Saint Helena where he remained a prisoner until his death in 1821. At the Congress of Vienna, sovereignty of the island was transferred to the Grand Duchy of Tuscany.

In film 
The 2006 comedy film Napoleon and Me is set during the Napoleon's rule on Elba.

Notes

References 
 
 
 
 
 

Elba
Palaces and residences of Napoleon
States and territories established in 1814
States and territories disestablished in 1815
1814 in Europe
1815 in Europe
History of Tuscany
Former monarchies of Europe